This is a list of active, dormant and extinct volcanoes in India.

See also
 Lists of volcanoes

References 
R. Bhutani, K. Pande, J.S. Ray, R.S. Smitha, N. Awasthi & A. Kumar, Paper No. 268-9, 2014 GSA Annual Meeting in Vancouver, British Columbia (19–22 October 2014)

India
 
Volcanoes